This is a list of French battleships of the period 1410–1639:

Nef de Morlaix/Marie de la Cordelière (Queen's ship) - Sunk in battle, 1512
Nef de Brest (Queen's ship)
Nef de Rochelle (Queen's ship)
Nef de Bordeaux (Queen's ship)
Saint Sauveur (Queen's ship)
Nef de Rouen (c. 1510) (King's ship)
Nef d'Orléans (c. 1510) (King's ship)
Nef de Dieppe (c. 1510) (King's ship)
Nef de Bordeaux (c. 1510) (King's ship)
Petite Louise (c. 1510) (King's ship)
Louise
? 16 - Captured by England 1512
Grand Nef de la Bouvardière
Grand Nef de St Malo
Nef de Guemadeuc
Nef de Tréguier
L'Espaigneul
Grand Nef of G. Finamour
Nef Jean Frolai
Nef de Vannes
Michelle
Sénéchal
Chapon
Grand Nef d'Ecosse (ex-Scottish Michael, purchased 1514)
Marie de Clermont
Havre du Grace (c. 1517)
Sibille
Peter of La Rochelle
Grand François
La Roberge
Santa Ana (c. 1581)
Theirry Henry
La Couronne (c. 1636)